Edward Rushworth  (17 October 1755  – 15 October 1817) was a British clergyman on the Isle of Wight, and a token politician.

Rushworth was the oldest son of Royal Navy Captain John Rushworth of Portsea in Hampshire. Educated at Winchester College and at Trinity College, Oxford, he became a deacon at Yarmouth on the Isle of Wight.

In 1780 he married Catherine Holmes, daughter Reverend Leonard Holmes (later the 1st Baron Holmes). His father-in-law was the patron of both the parliamentary boroughs on the island.

He was a Member of Parliament (MP) for the two boroughs on the Isle of Wight for several periods between 1780 and 1797. He was MP for Yarmouth from 1781 to 1781, for Newport from 1784 to 1790, for Yarmouth in 1790, and for Yarmouth again from 1796 to 1797.

He appears to have held the seats only as a placeholder, and did not take part in any parliamentary proceedings.

References
 

1755 births
1817 deaths
People from Yarmouth, Isle of Wight
18th-century Anglican deacons
People educated at Winchester College
Alumni of Trinity College, Oxford
Members of Parliament for the Isle of Wight
British MPs 1780–1784
British MPs 1784–1790
British MPs 1790–1796
British MPs 1796–1800
18th-century Church of England clergy